Scopula acentra is a moth of the family Geometridae. It was described by Warren in 1897. It is endemic to South Africa.

References

Moths described in 1897
acentra
Endemic moths of South Africa
Taxa named by William Warren (entomologist)